The 2001 Big 12 Conference women's basketball tournament was held March 6–10, 2001, at Municipal Auditorium in Kansas City, MO.

Number 3 seed  defeated number 1 seed  68–65 to win their 2nd championship and receive the conference's automatic bid to the 2001 NCAA tournament.

Seeding
The Tournament consisted of a 12 team single-elimination tournament with the top 4 seeds receiving a bye.

Schedule

Tournament

All-Tournament team
Most Outstanding Player – Angie Welle, Iowa State

See also
2001 Big 12 Conference men's basketball tournament
2001 NCAA Division I women's basketball tournament
2000–01 NCAA Division I women's basketball rankings

References

Big 12 Conference women's basketball tournament
Tournament
Big 12 Conference women's basketball tournament
Big 12 Conference women's basketball tournament